Srae Ambel is a district (srok) of Koh Kong Province, in south-western Cambodia.

Notes

Districts of Koh Kong province